The Galloping Fish is a 1924 American silent comedy film directed by Del Andrews and starring Louise Fazenda, Syd Chaplin, Ford Sterling, Chester Conklin, Lucille Ricksen, and John Steppling. It is based on the 1917 novel Friend Wife by Frank R. Adams. The film was released by First National Pictures on March 10, 1924.

The film was later re-released by Selected Pictures in 1930 with talking sequences.

Plot
As described in a film magazine review, Freddie, a trained seal, is smuggled out of a theatre using an ambulance by George Fitzgerald, the fiancé of his owner, Undine, a vaudeville performer, to escape seizure for debt. Freddy Wetherill, George's friend, assists. The latter is notified that his rich uncle is dying and wants Wetherill's wife Hyla to nurse him. But the husband and wife have quarreled, so Undine substitutes for the wife and is accompanied by George, as Wetherill's valet. A flood engulfs the uncle's house. The occupants seek the roof, where escaping animals from a circus also find refuge. They are all finally rescued by the seal, who conveys them ashore with the aid of a telegraph pole.

Cast

Preservation
Prints of the film survives at the Filmoteka Narodowa in Warszawa, Poland and Cineteca Italiana in Milan, Italy.

References

External links

1924 comedy films
First National Pictures films
Silent American comedy films
1924 films
American silent feature films
American black-and-white films
Films directed by Del Andrews
1920s American films